is a Japanese professional footballer who plays for Gamba Osaka in the J1 League. He plays as a forward or a winger.

Club career

Gamba Osaka
Usami made club history by making his professional debut for Gamba Osaka at the age of 17 years and 14 days and scoring a goal in the same match to become the youngest player to achieve both feats for the club, breaking the records previously set by Junichi Inamoto. Usami made his professional debut and goal on 20 May 2009 against FC Seoul in the Champions League. He finished the 2009 season with a goal in four matches played, which includes three league matches, and a Champions League match. In 2010, he became a more regular face in the Gamba Osaka team and he was named as Best Young Player by the J. League at the annual awards ceremony on 6 December.

Bayern Munich
In June 2011, it was confirmed that Usami would be loaned out to Bayern Munich, with an option to buy next summer. He joined the club in mid-July. Usami told the media in a news conference that a chance like that did not come every day, and that he was looking forward to this big challenge. When he was asked about Bayern's current first-team players, he said: "I want to improve my skills to the point, where I can take their places."
Usami scored his first competitive goal for the Bavarians on 26 October 2011, in a DFB Cup match against FC Ingolstadt, after coming off the bench in the 73rd minute.

1899 Hoffenheim
Usami scored two goals in 21 matches played for 1899 Hoffenheim.

FC Augsburg

2016–17 season
Usami joined Augsburg in the summer of 2016. He played in 11 matches during the 2016–17 season.

Loan to Fortuna Düsseldorf
Usami was loaned to Fortuna Düsseldorf for the 2017–18 season. He played a key role in helping them gain promotion to the Bundesliga. He finished the 2017–18 season with eight goals in 28 matches played.

2018–19 season
Usami returned to Augsburg for the 2018–19 season.

Second loan to Fortuna Düsseldorf
On 4 August 2018, Usami rejoined Fortuna Düsseldorf on a season-long loan for the 2018–19 season.

International career
In October 2009, Usami was elected Japan U17 national team for 2009 FIFA U-17 World Cup. He played all three matches. In July 2012, he was elected Japan U23 national team for 2012 Summer Olympics. He played four matches and Japan won the fourth place.

Usami debuted for Japan in a friendly match against Tunisia on 27 March 2015. He scored his debut goal in a friendly match against Uzbekistan on 31 March 2015. In May 2018 he was named in Japan's preliminary squad for the 2018 FIFA World Cup in Russia.

Career statistics

Club

International

Scores and results list Japan's goal tally first, score column indicates score after each Usami goal.

Honours
Gamba Osaka
 J1 League: 2014
 J2 League: 2013
 Emperor's Cup: 2014, 2015
 J.League Cup: 2014
Japanese Super Cup: 2015

Bayern Munich
 DFB-Pokal runner-up: 2011–12
 UEFA Champions League runner-up: 2011–12

Individual
J.League Rookie of the Year: 2010
J.League Cup New Hero Award: 2014
J.League Best Eleven: 2014, 2015

References

External links

 
 
 
 Takashi Usami at Gamba Osaka official site 
 Takashi Usami at Yahoo! Japan sports 
 

1992 births
Living people
Association football people from Kyoto Prefecture
Association football forwards
Association football midfielders
Japanese footballers
Japan youth international footballers
Japan international footballers
J1 League players
J2 League players
Bundesliga players
2. Bundesliga players
Regionalliga players
Gamba Osaka players
FC Bayern Munich footballers
FC Bayern Munich II players
TSG 1899 Hoffenheim players
FC Augsburg players
Fortuna Düsseldorf players
Olympic footballers of Japan
Footballers at the 2012 Summer Olympics
Japanese expatriate footballers
Japanese expatriate sportspeople in Germany
Expatriate footballers in Germany
2018 FIFA World Cup players